The following lists events that happened in 1945 in El Salvador.

Incumbents
President: Osmín Aguirre y Salinas (until 1 March), Salvador Castaneda Castro (starting 1 March)
Vice President: Vacant (until 1 March), Manuel Adriano Vilanova (starting 1 March)

Events

January
 14–16 January – Voters in El Salvador voted Salvador Castaneda Castro as President of El Salvador with 312,754 votes in a 99.70% margin. Osmín Aguirre y Salinas heavily rigged the election in favor of Castaneda Castro.

March
 1 March – Social Democratic Unification Party candidate Salvador Castaneda Castro was sworn in as President of El Salvador. Manuel Adriano Vilanova was sworn in as Vice President.

August
 20 August – C.D. Once Municipal, a Salvadoran soccer team, was established.

Undated
 The National Pro Patria Party was dissolved.
 San Juan Tepezontes was incorporated as a municipality.

References

 
El Salvador
1940s in El Salvador
Years of the 20th century in El Salvador
El Salvador